Rolly is an egg-shaped digital robotic music player made by Sony, combining music functions with robotic dancing. It has two wheels that allow it to rotate and spin, as well as two bands of colored LED light running around its edge and cup-like "wings" (or "arms" according to the Sony sonystyle USA website) which can open and close on either end, all of which can be synchronized to the music being played.

Rolly has several operating modes, including Bluetooth functionality.  Rolly can play music streamed directly from any Bluetooth-enabled cell phone, computer, or mp3 player.  Rolly is able to dance along to streaming music, but the Rolly Choreographer software produces far better results when it analyzes tracks and creates motion files before loading them onto Rolly.  The Rolly player uses  files to store motion data along with a particular music track.  Pre-made motion files can be downloaded and uploaded from Rolly Go.

Rolly also has an accelerometer which detects if the player is laying horizontally or being held upright.  When held upright, the track next/previous can be controlled by the top wheel and volume up/down can be controlled by the bottom wheel.  Tracks can be shuffled by holding the unit upright, pressing the button once, then shaking the unit up and down (light color changes to purple).  You can return to continuous play (light color blue) by simply repeating this process.

Rolly has 2 gigabytes of flash memory to store music files. In some markets it came pre-loaded with the track Boogie Wonderland by Earth, Wind & Fire.

On August 20, 2007, Sony launched an initial teaser advertising campaign for the product. The product was unveiled on September 20, 2007, and went on sale in Japan on September 29, and was for sale at the Sony sonystyle USA website for $229.99 USD, down from $399.99 USD. It is available in black and white. Sony offers the "Engrave it." option for this item, and a number of accessories, including "arms" in different colors.

Around 2009, the Rolly appeared to be discontinued.

Sony BSP60
In 2015 Sony presented a Bluetooth speaker featuring a similar design and feature set as the Rolly boasted, with the addition of an OLED display and support for voice commands.

References

External links 

 Fan Page and Support For Rolly Sep 10/50 (Japanese Version) and Sep-30BT
 Sony Rolly - Era -Viral Video by Claw Films London
 Head and Neck Sessions vs. Sony Rolly
 Sony Rolly takes disco to the streets
 Sony Rolly dances to Footloose

Entertainment robots
Robotics at Sony
Sony products
Discontinued products
2007 robots
Products and services discontinued in 2009
Rolling robots
Audio players